Ralph Delaval was an English naval admiral.

Ralph Delaval may also refer to:

Sir Ralph Delaval, 1st Baronet (1622–1691)
Sir Ralph Delaval, 2nd Baronet (1649–1696), of the Delaval baronets

See also
Delaval (surname)